OIV Tower Sljeme is a 169-metre (563 ft) tall TV and radio tower built of reinforced concrete on the summit of the 1035 metre (3450 ft) tall peak Sljeme of the Medvednica mountain north of Zagreb, Croatia.

Zagreb TV Tower was built in 1973.  It is not open to public, although at  level there is a space for a foreseen tower restaurant.

On 4 October 1991, during the Croatian War of Independence, the tower was a target of a Yugoslav Air Force attack. The tower was bombed at 16:10 and as a consequence the entire fourth and fifth floors and a portion of the third floor sustained heavy damage, rendering the tower unusable. Two staff members present at the time of the attack were not hurt as they took shelter at the base of the tower. It took three months to repair the damage. During that time the television programme was broadcast via several low-power transmitters located within Zagreb itself and on top of the Medvednica Mountain. The alternate transmitters were already in position at the time because an attack against the tower was considered possible.

There are some speculations about the opening of the tower restaurant, as a part of the "Sljeme" project, which includes building of the new ski-tracks, and an extension of the cable car line.

FM

DAB+ 

Experimental test transmission until November 2018.

DAB broadcast from this transmitter has been received several times in south-west Slovakia, 300 km away.

Digital television (DVB-T2)

See also 
 List of tallest buildings in Croatia
 Medvednica

References

External links 
  Radiotelevizijski toranj "Sljeme" (A detailed description with schematics)
  Zagreb TV Tower information

Towers completed in 1973
Buildings and structures in Zagreb
Towers in Croatia
Radio masts and towers in Europe
Observation towers